Llanycefn railway station, also known as Llan-y-cefn railway station, served the hamlet of Llanycefn, Pembrokeshire in the parish of Maenclochog, Wales, from 1876 to 1949 on the Narberth Road and Maenclochog Railway.

History 
The station opened on 19 September 1876 by the Narberth Road and Maenclochog Railway. To the south was a goods siding which only handled parcels and a few other miscellaneous goods. The points were operated by a ground frame. There was also a signal box south of the level crossing. The station closed and reopened a lot, first closing on 1 January 1883, reopening in December 1884, closing again on 31 March 1885, reopening again on 21 March 1887, closing yet again on 25 May 1887, reopening yet again on 11 April 1895 when the line was extended closing on 8 January 1917 and reopening one last time on 12 July 1920. The signal box closed in 1923. It closed to passengers permanently on 25 October 1937 and closing to goods traffic on 16 May 1949.

References

External links 

Disused railway stations in Pembrokeshire
Railway stations in Great Britain opened in 1878
Railway stations in Great Britain closed in 1883
Railway stations in Great Britain opened in 1884
Railway stations in Great Britain closed in 1885
Railway stations in Great Britain opened in 1887
Railway stations in Great Britain closed in 1887
Railway stations in Great Britain opened in 1895
Railway stations in Great Britain closed in 1917
Railway stations in Great Britain opened in 1920
Railway stations in Great Britain closed in 1937
1878 establishments in Wales
Former Great Western Railway stations